Batrachedra stenosema is a moth in the family Batrachedridae. It is found in Australia (including New South Wales).

References

Natural History Museum Lepidoptera generic names catalog

Batrachedridae
Moths of Australia
Moths described in 1904